The Anngrove Stud is a horse breeding stud of approximately 350 acres established about 1970 near Mountmellick, County Laois, Ireland.

Stud horses
2019
 Marcel is holding stud from 2019.

References

Horse breeding and studs
Buildings and structures in County Laois